Jimzu, also known as Gimzo (meaning "sycamore plantation"), was a Palestinian village, located three miles southeast of Lydda. Under the 1947 UN Partition Plan of Mandatory Palestine, Jimzu was to form part of the proposed Arab state. During the 1948 Arab–Israeli War, the village was depopulated in a two-day assault by Israeli forces.

Under the 1949 Armistice Agreements, Jimzu's lands fell under the de facto governance of the newly created state of Israel. A year later, moshav Gimzo was established at the site of the former village and is now populated by 700 Israeli Jewish residents.

History
Jimzu is identified with the ancient Gimzo, a city mentioned in the Bible as being in the plain of Judah whose villages were seized by the Philistines (as recorded in the ).
The town was home to the Tannaic sage Nahum of Gimzo.

Ottoman era
Jimzu, along with the whole of Palestine, came under the rule of the Ottoman Empire after it defeated the Mamluks at the Battle of Marj Dabiq in 1516. The village was incorporated into the Ottoman nahiya (subdistrict) of Ramla (al-Khalīl) under the Liwa of Gaza ("District of Gaza"). In the 1596 tax records, it is recorded that the village of Jimzu had 28 families, all Muslim; an estimated  population of 154. They paid a tax rate of 25%  on agricultural products,  including wheat, barley and fruits, as well as goats and beehives, in addition to "occasional revenues"; a total of 6,990 Akçe.

Biblical scholar Edward Robinson passed through the village in 1838, and reported it to be "rather large", situated on an eminence, "to make quite a show at a distance". He also noted that the village had many subterranean magazines for storing grain. It was noted as being situated in the Ramleh district.

In 1863 Victor Guérin found the village have 400 inhabitants, and to be surrounded by olive and palm trees. The village also had a Makam for a Sidi Ahmed. Each family had its own silo.

An Ottoman village list of about 1870 counted 83 houses and a population of  325  in Dschimzu, though  the population count included men, only. 

In 1882, the PEF's Survey of Western Palestine (SWP)  described  Jimzu as a village built of adobe bricks and situated on the side of a low hill, surrounded by cactus hedges and olive trees.

British Mandate era
In the 1922 census of Palestine, conducted by the British Mandate authorities, Jemzu had a population of 897 inhabitants, all  Muslims,  increasing in the 1931 census to 1,081, still all Muslims, in a total of 268 houses.

The villagers of Jimzu maintained a mosque. An elementary school was established in the village in 1920, and by the mid-1940s it had 175 students.

Most villagers worked in agriculture. In  the  1945 statistics, the population was 1,510, all Muslims, while the total land area was 9,681 dunams, according to an official land and population survey. Of this, a total of 77 dunums was devoted to citrus and bananas, while 5,577 dunums were allocated to cereals. 1,605 dunums were irrigated or used for orchards, of which 1,400 dunums was for olives,  while 50 dunams were classified as built-up public areas.

1948 war
Jizmu was occupied by the Yiftach Brigade, of the newly formed Israeli army, on July 10, 1948, in the first phase of Operation Dani.

According to Benny Morris:"The intention, from the first, was to depopulate [Jimzu and surrounding villages]. On 10 July, Yiftah Brigade HQ informed Dani HQ: Our forces are clearing the 'Innaba-Jimzu-Daniyal area and are torching everything that can be burned.'"
The following day (11 July) Yiftach informed Dani Headquarters, that its forces had conquered Jimzu and Daniyal and were "busy clearing the villages and blowing up the houses [´oskot betihur hakfarim u´fitzutz habatim]" All of Jimzu's inhabitants left as a result of the assault by Israeli forces. Its 434 homes were demolished on September 13, 1948.

The settlement of Gimzo was established on village land in 1950.  Palestinian historian Walid Khalidi described the remains of Jimzu in 1992: "All that remains of the houses are stones, strewn over the site, and some crumbled walls. The site is overgrown with shrubs and thorny plants. Other kind of vegetation also grow on village land, including Christ´s-thorn trees, foxtail, cactuses, and some abandoned olive trees." The most well known family from Jimzu was the Elqaza family.

See also
Depopulated Palestinian locations in Israel
List of villages depopulated during the Arab-Israeli conflict

References

Bibliography

 p.834

External links
 Welcome to Jimzu
 Jimzu, Zochrot
Survey of Western Palestine, Map 14:    IAA, Wikimedia commons
 Carob, Fennel, and the Red Soil of Gimzo: Crafting Palestinian Identity

Arab villages depopulated during the 1948 Arab–Israeli War
Philistines
District of Ramla